Discovery Bay (DB) is a resort town on Lantau Island, Hong Kong. It consists of mixed, primarily residential, development, in particular upmarket residential development and private and public recreational facilities, including garden houses, low-, mid- and high-rise residential developments, a 27-hole golf course, an ice rink, a 262-berth marina, two clubhouses, the first private manmade beach in Hong Kong, international schools, two shopping malls and the largest oceanfront alfresco dining area in Hong Kong.

The 2016 census record 20,271 people living at DB; over 50% of them are non-Chinese and DB is a sizeable community of expatriates from over fifty countries. DB is located 2 km west of Hong Kong Disneyland Resort and approximately 12 km west from the nearest point on Hong Kong Island.

As of April 2018, Discovery Bay consists of 15 residential development phases with properties ranging from garden houses to low-, mid- and high-rise. The development also features a 400-metre-long privately owned beach (accessible to the public), four private membership clubs including a golf club and a marina club, and a public park (Siena Central Park).

Discovery Bay is a key community in Lantau Island (after Tung Chung) and enjoys a very low plot ratio of 0.15. Pets are allowed in Discovery Bay.

History

In May 1973, the Hong Kong Resort Company (HKR) was established by Edward Wong Wing-cheung, a Hong Kong merchant. Following two years of planning and negotiation, a 'Master Plan' was agreed in December 1975 between HKR and the Hong Kong government. By New Grant No. 6122 of 10 September 1976, HKR agreed  The plan called for development, on Lot 385 at Tai Pak Wan, of "membership club houses and a leisure resort and associated facilities which shall include an hotel or hotels ... a cable-car system ... and a non-membership golf course ..." In addition, HKR handed over HK$61.5 million in exchange for the grant and undertook to spend no less than another HK$600 million on development (excluding site formation costs) within 10 years of the grant.

Within months, however, Wong faced financial difficulty. The Soviet-government controlled Moscow Narodny Bank Limited filed a writ in Hong Kong on 1 April 1977 against Wong himself for return of US$7 million advanced in 1973, as well as against Wong's Panamanian bank holding company, Paclantic Financing Co., Inc. (which was HKR's majority shareholder), for US$22.12 million in proceedings in Panama. Both the Chinese and British governments were concerned to prevent the property rights to the single largest piece of privately controlled land in Hong Kong falling into the hands of the Russian bank during times of deepening political uncertainty for Hong Kong. Sir David Akers-Jones, then-Secretary for the New Territories, led the government's efforts to avert that prospect, steering HKR into the hands of Hong Kong-based Chinese industrialist Cha Chi-ming. It is suspected that Cha decided to bid for the project under the instruction of Liao Chengzhi, then director of China's Hong Kong and Macao Affairs Office to avoid Soviet acquisition of Hong Kong land.

Having lost control of HKR and facing bankruptcy proceedings, Wong left Hong Kong in January 1977 while mooting the establishment of a Pacific Atlantic Bank of Miami and going into the casino business with the Anderson group of whom one Robert B. Anderson, of One Rockefeller Plaza, had been a fellow director on the HKR board.

The Cha family, better known for running China Dyeing Works Ltd during the 1970s, an international textile group, purchased HKR in May 1977. By 1979 all debts were paid off and work started on the reservoir and the core infrastructure but for a very different sort of project – essentially a residential community offering a relaxed lifestyle. This decision was revisited in 2004 when it was discovered that Akers-Jones did not seek approval from the Executive Council (ExCo) for the deviation from the terms of the Land Grant. In a 2004 report by the government's Audit Commission, the Lands Department was severely criticized for allowing this to happen, particularly since Akers-Jones did not call on HKR under Cha to pay any additional land premium. After retiring from government, in 2000 Akers-Jones joined the board of Mingly Corporation, also controlled by Cha.

Unlike other large Hong Kong developments, everything in DB was built with private money, including roads, electricity and the water supply. The government-operated fire and police station, community hall and the government-aided primary school were also built by the developer. These developments have to be approved and checked by the government with the official Master Plan version 6.0a in 2003, including the major extension in 2003 in Yi Pak Wan.

Climate

Current development

DB was developed in phases and the developer, HKR, envisages that DB will eventually be home to 25,000 residents. The following data applies as of April 2008:

Community, recreation and entertainment

Community life centres on two commercial hubs: DB Plaza and DB North Plaza. DB Plaza features a bus terminus, ferry pier, an open piazza, and a range of shops, medical and dental clinics, and a veterinary surgery. The two plazas each have a supermarket and a range of international themed restaurants, bars and food outlets.

Amenities include: two schools, a beach at Tai Pak Bay; four private membership recreational clubs including a 27-hole golf course and a marina (where some people live on house boats); natural streams and rock pools: a bicycle track alongside Discovery Bay Road; an astro-turf football pitch; basketball courts; children's playgrounds scattered around the developments and hiking paths leading to other parts of Lantau Island – including the Trappist Haven Monastery and Mui Wo. A Community Centre / Indoor Recreation Centre was finally completed in 2007, seven years after the extended development in Yi Pak was approved. It was handed over to government-appointed operators in April 2009.

DB is a 15 to 25 minute bus ride from Tung Chung.

Clubs in DB
(All are private clubs with separate membership fees)
Discovery Bay Recreation Club and Club Siena (DBRC)
Discovery Bay Marina Club (DBMC)
Discovery Bay Golf Club (DBGC)

Housing units in DB used to be sold with a DBRC debenture (and later a right to join the club), although residents can choose whether to be active members and pay a monthly subscription. DBRC members are automatically members of Club Siena. Debentures of DBMC and DBGC are traded in the secondary market.

The Maria opens into Nim Shue Wan, a bay to the south of DB. There is also a public landing stage for cargo boats and privately operated kat-to ferries that link DB to nearby Peng Chau Island and the Trappist Haven Monastery pier about 2 km to the south. There are also Kai-to services connecting to Mui Wo (Silvermine Bay).

Residents also run activities and groups. These include the Lantau Boat Club (a catamaran sailing and outrigger canoe club), Discovery Bay Pirates Rugby Club, and numerous religious services.

Auberge Discovery Bay Hong Kong

The resort hotel on the waterfront of Yi Pak opened in March 2013 complements the resort lifestyle of Discovery Bay. The 325-room resort features an outdoor swimming pool, gym, all-day dining, Spa Botanica, and 1,300 square metres of function space comprising a 700 square metres ballroom and 11 function rooms; all available to suit every need and stay for leisure, meeting, incentive, event, wedding or a special celebration. Opening alongside the hotel is the first-ever seaside glass wedding chapel in Hong Kong. The glamorous white chapel is 16-metre tall, offering a capacity of 100 guests and a sea view as backdrop for weddings.

Landscape and wildlife

As with most of the terrain in Hong Kong, Lantau Island seems to be a set of hills that rise out of the water. DB is wedged between the hills and the sea and both environments are accessible from the edges of the developed areas. The hills of Lantau tend to fall dramatically into jungle-covered valleys that spread up into verdant, grass-covered hills. DB has a series of rock pools which lead to one such valley and into a man-made addition to the water-drainage system. (Note: DB has switched to Government potable water supply since 2000)

DB is home to animals of many kinds, most of which are domestic pets. There are, however, a number of wild species that lived or are living on Lantau Island that can be found in and around DB. Most of these creatures are birds such as finches, tits, gulls and kites. Until the construction of the new Hong Kong International Airport in Chek Lap Kok, wild cattle and water buffalo thrived in the pasture-like hills. Increasingly vigorous development all over Hong Kong has reduced the habitat of the local dolphin and whale populations. The most famous of these is the Chinese white dolphin, often called the pink dolphin due to a slight pinkish cast to their skin. (See Environment of Hong Kong)

Environmental awareness
DB was awarded the Green Property Management Award (Private Housing) in 2002. To make DB a greener town, DBSML, the management company of DB, has replaced conventional ballasts with energy-saving tubes. The number of lights in common corridors and main entrances of buildings were re-assessed and unnecessary lights were removed. It was thought that a 30% reduction in electricity charges was achieved in La Vista, one of the villages. Apart from energy reduction, flea market, old books collection, old clothes collection and used household items collection have been held on a regular basis to promote recycling.

Transportation network

DB is connected the rest of Hong Kong via a road tunnel to the North Lantau Expressway and by a 24-hour ferry service.

All services (except Kai-to services) accept Hong Kong's Octopus card as well as cash. Half-price discounts are offered to children, senior citizens and students under the age of 18 on the external bus and ferry routes.

External transport
Scheduled external public transport services include:

Ferry services
 A 24-hour ferry service plies between DB Pier on Tai Pak Bay and Pier 3 in Central District on Hong Kong Island (journey time of approximately thirty minutes; frequency of around 15–30 minutes during day time, and 60–90 minutes from 00:00-06:00). Current ticket price, paid by Octopus Card, is HKD$46 for adults and HKD$23 for children for a single journey; and HKD$65.5 for adults and HKD$42.5 for children on services between 00:00-06:00. If using a DB Resident's Octopus Card, the prices for adults and children / students will be HKD$33.5 and HKD$16.8 (regular services); and HKD$50.5 and HKD$33.8 (night services) respectively. Seniors can enjoy the HKD$2 scheme subsidised by the government. Since 2005, ferries have been equipped with free on-board Wi-Fi wireless broadband Internet, which is unique not only in Hong Kong but across Asia.
Kai-to ferries operated by an independent operator link DB to nearby Peng Chau Island (via Trappist Haven Monastery) and Mui Wo, also on Lantau Island (journey time approximately 10 and 20 minutes respectively)
There are 2 discount package provided by DBTPL. For plan A, there are total 1,550 stored points in transport card for adult at a price of HK$1,310 and 775 for child at a price of HK$655. For plan B, there are 930 stored points in the card for adult and 465 points for child. The prices are HK$858 and HK$429 respectively.
Ferry information:  Ferry Model Quantity Capacity 42/43 m. Marinteknik waterjet catamarans (DB1,2,3,5,7,8) 6 500 35 m. Marinteknik waterjet monohulls  (DB19, DB20) Note: DB21 & DB22 laid afloat 2 300

Ferries were the only way to reach Discovery Bay until the opening of the DB Tunnel in 2000. Ferries remain the main way to reach DB and are operated by DBTPL, a wholly owned subsidiary of HKR. The route between DB and Central is served by monohull and catamaran waterjets manufactured by Marinteknik in Singapore; seating 300 and 500 passengers respectively.

Road transport

In 2000, a 2.4 km road tunnel linking DB to the North Lantau Expressway opened, enabling access to DB by road - and shortening the journey to other parts of Lantau, Kowloon and the New Territories. From the tunnel's inauguration, shuttle bus services ran to Tung Chung and the Hong Kong International Airport in Chek Lap Kok, and shortly after the opening of Hong Kong Disneyland and the Sunny Bay MTR station in June 2005, an additional route between Sunny Bay and DB was launched, further shortening the time to reach Kowloon and New Territories. The DB02R and A both cost $35 and the other external buses cost $10 for adults and $5 for children.

The five external bus routes are operated by Discovery Bay Transit Services Limited (DBTSL), another wholly owned subsidiary of HKRI:
 DB01R: From DB Plaza to Tung Chung MTR station (journey time approximately 15–20 minutes; frequency of every 20 minutes during day time, every 10 minutes at peak hours).
 DB02R: From DB Plaza to Hong Kong International Airport in Chek Lap Kok (via Cathay City; journey time approximately 20–30 minutes; frequency of every 30 minutes during day time, every 60 minutes at midnight hours, 24-hour service)
 DB02A: From DB(N) Commercial Centre to Hong Kong International Airport in Chek Lap Kok (via Cathay City; journey time approximately 20–30 minutes; frequency of every 60 minutes during day time)
 DB03R: From DB Marina Drive to Sunny Bay MTR station (journey time approximately 15–20 minutes; frequency of every 20 minutes during day time, every 5–8 minutes at peak hours).
 DB03P: From DB(N) Commercial Centre to Sunny Bay MTR station (journey time approximately 15–20 minutes; frequency of every 30 minutes during day time, every 20 minutes at peak hours).

Internal transport
Commuting within DB is done via a 24-hour internal shuttle bus service operated by DBTSL, which runs between various parts of DB and the Bus Terminus by the DB Plaza/the ferry pier. Travelling between the various villages by bus requires a change at the Bus Terminus. The same applies for residents not living on a direct connection to the schools, churches and most of the clubs. Yet, residents can use the hire car service which is operates as a point-to-point minibus shuttle service (e.g. operating on a basis similar to SuperShuttle airport services in the States). Residents can also drive their own golf carts or bicycles to travel around DB as an alternative. The internal buses charge $5.2 or $4.4 if the passenger has a DB resident octopus card.

 T1: From Headland Drive to Temporary Bus Terminus
 T2: Midvale Village to La Serene
 T3: Parkvale Village to Capeland Drive
 T4: DB North Plaza to Coastline Villa
 T6: Seabee Lane to Temporary Bus Terminus
 T9: DB North Plaza to Caperidge Drive
 9A: Chianti to Temporary Bus Terminus
 DB06R: From DBRC to Club Siena

Private transport
Private cars and taxis are not permitted to enter the area, with a few exceptions for certain agents of the developer, local businesses or for emergency needs. 

Golf carts are a common transport for residents. The use of golf carts in DB is common for commuting from one part of DB to another but not outside of DB. The number of golf carts is restricted by Hong Kong Transport Department to 500. The golf carts are powered using petrol.

The presence of golf carts (with a much slower maximum speed than normal private cars) creates a safer road environment than many other places in Hong Kong, especially compared with the road traffic density in other parts of the territory. As such, DB has gained a reputation for its child and pet-friendly environment.

Education
A number of schools and colleges operate in Discovery Bay, ranging from kindergartens to secondary schools. This ranges from government-subsidised to private schools.

Discovery Bay is in Primary One Admission (POA) School Net 99, which contains two aided schools: SKH Wei Lun Primary School in Discovery Bay and Holy Family School in Peng Chau; no government primary schools are in this net.

Schools located within Discovery Bay include:
Discovery Bay International School (DBIS), was built by the developer in 1983. It is an English language private international kindergarten, primary and early secondary school providing education from Year 1 to Year 13.
Discovery College, a primary and secondary 'through-train' school set up under the government's Private Independent Schools scheme. The college opened for the 2008–2009 academic year, currently operating from Year 1 to Year 13.
SKH Wei Lun Primary School, a Chinese language government aided Anglican primary school providing education from Year 1 to Year 6.
Discovery Mind Primary School, opened in 2012, provided private primary education.
L'Ecole Pierre et Marie Curie Education Centre, a French school, offering programmes in French, English and Mandarin, for Year 1 to Year 6 students.

Nursery and kindergartens operating within Discovery Bay include:
Discovery Montessori school (DMS), located in the north plaza,
Discovery Bay International School (DBIS) Kindergarten, an English language private international kindergarten;
Discovery Mind Kindergarten (DMK), a private kindergarten operating Chinese and English sessions; and
Sunshine House, an English language private international kindergarten.
La Petite Enfance Kindergarten, a French language private international kindergarten.

There are a number of parents that send their children to the schools in Hong Kong Island, Tung Chung and the Kwai Tsing District.

A further site has been earmarked for the development of a Catholic 'through train' School. However, as of August 2009, this is still at the proposed stage.

Municipal services
DB is owned and developed by HKR, the developer. Discovery Bay Services Management Limited (DBSML), a subsidiary of HKR, manages the development. DB used to have its own private water supply from a reservoir and water treatment plant located near the golf course in the mountain valley above the estate. Since DB Tunnel opened in 2000, DB has been connected to the municipal supply from the Water Supplies Department which sources its water both from reservoirs throughout Hong Kong, Lantau Island and the New Territories and from the Pearl River Delta in the Mainland. Current municipal facilities inside DB include a fire station and ambulance depot, a post office and a police reporting post. These facilities were built by the developer and services rendered by various government bodies.

With the opening of the DB Tunnel in 2000, the Government deemed the police station and fire station/ambulance depot unnecessary, and DB relies on services provided by the headquarters in Tung Chung. A Community Centre has also been built at the Yi Pak Bay and it should have been handed over to and operated by the Government in 2009.

Issues and criticisms
Plans have been made to enhance facilities, leisure and dining options around the DB Plaza.

Discovery Bay Marina Club 2018 
On 31 August 2018 the DBMC gave notice to all 200+ boat owners to vacate the marina permanently by 31 December, 2018 for renovations. The majority of these boats are stay-a-boards, used by families. The DBMC offered no time line for the renovations or indication that the boats would be allowed to return. A public campaign was started to have the HKRI reverse their decision.

Sports ground
Discovery bay currently has one artificial turf pitch beside the community centre, located in the north plaza (there is also a pitch located in-between the two Primary schools).

Transport

Whereas other parts of Hong Kong are generally well served by frequent transport options from competing operators, DB is served solely by DBTSL and DBTPL, both subsidiaries of HKRI.

Ferry dispute, 2008-2009
On 8 October 2008, the sole ferry service operator DBTPL proposed to increase the ferry fares between Discovery Bay and Central up to 64 per cent. A questionnaire received by residents from Discovery Bay Transportation Services proposes an increase of 16 per cent to 64 per cent. The frequency of services would depend on the size of the increase. A single ride now costs HK$27, or HK$23.20 in 50-trip tickets (Child tickets are HK$17.00). Under the lowest fare-rise option, the number of services on weekdays would fall by 113 to just 40. Under this option, ferries would only travel every 70 minutes even during the morning peak. Overnight ferries could also be scrapped in favour of a coach service from Central. Residents also have the choice of taking buses to Sunny Bay and Tung Chung MTR stations. The ferry operator said in a letter to residents that annual fuel expenses had risen from HK$20 million in 2001 to a projected HK$80 million this year and it had been operating at a deficit, with an accumulated loss of more than HK$120 million since 2001.

HKRI has come up with a new proposal which calls for a 27.5% increase (for 50 trip holders) and a 33.3% increase (for single trips). Furthermore, frequencies are to be reduced from 113 sailings a day to 80. After midnight services will be replaced by a coach service. Residents are still concerned that this is still a substantial increase given the current economic situation and fuel prices have fallen below US$50.00. The eventual deal agreed with the Transport Department (TD) was for single fares of HK$31 per journey with an overnight surcharge of HK$13 per journey between 00:00 and 06:00. This represented a general price increase of 10%.

Ferry prices, 2018-2019

A further increase by HKRI was implemented on June 10, 2018. The new cost of a standard ticket from Discovery Bay to Central will rise a further 15% to HK$46 for adults, while the price of a child's ticket, aged 1 to below 12, will rise to $23. Overnight, sailings on or after 12:00 midnight and before 6:00 am, will see a +HK$19.50 surcharge. If you were to pay via Octopus Card, the same charges take effect. Senior citizens can enjoy a HK$2 Government Scheme.

A single adult trip using a Transport Card (T-Card) will cost 43.5 stored points, and overnight 66.5 stored points. A child T-Card trip will cost 21.8 stored points, and 44.7 stored points overnight.

As of October 2017, any DB resident including owners, tenants, occupants and domestic helpers can enjoy privileges around Discovery Bay with a registered DB Resident's Octopus Card. A single adult trip with this card costs HK$33.5, and HK$50.50 overnight. For children, a single trip costs HK$16.80 and overnight HK$33.8. Again, senior citizens enjoy a HK$2 Government Scheme.

Construction
As an ongoing residential development, construction sites, continual renovation work to many increasingly older apartments and the subsequent dust and noise is an ever-present issue in DB. Buildings are generally renovated every seven years, in compliance with the government regulations.

Environment
A number of green groups are pushing for the re-introduction of electric golf carts, replacing the current petrol powered golf carts. However, this is being faced with some resistance of the management company and residents as there are other green priorities including upgrading of the buses to Euro standards.

DB suffers few natural disasters, with the exception of typhoons and hillfires as a result of a mixture of dry weather and carelessness.

See also
 Lantau Island
Lo Fu Tau
 List of areas of Hong Kong
 List of buildings and structures in Hong Kong

References

External links

 

 
HKR International